Petar Tachev (born 23 July 1938) is a Bulgarian weightlifter. He competed at the 1960 Summer Olympics and the 1964 Summer Olympics.

References

External links
 

1938 births
Living people
Bulgarian male weightlifters
Olympic weightlifters of Bulgaria
Weightlifters at the 1960 Summer Olympics
Weightlifters at the 1964 Summer Olympics
People from Veliko Tarnovo
Sportspeople from Veliko Tarnovo Province